Ronald Kevin Collins (9 April 1922 – 1 December 2007) was an Australian rules footballer who played with South Melbourne in the Victorian Football League (VFL).

Notes

External links 

1922 births
Australian rules footballers from Victoria (Australia)
Sydney Swans players
Sandringham Football Club players
2007 deaths